María Dolores Dancausa Treviño (born 1959) is a Spanish executive. She is the current CEO of Bankinter, a position she has held since 2010.

Early life and education 
Dancausa holds a degree in Law from the Colegio Universitario San Pablo CEU. She participated in several management programmes at Harvard Business School and completed an Advanced Management Programme at INSEAD.

Career 
Dancausa began her career at Banco Exterior de España before joining Bankinter. She was appointed as CEO of Linea Directa Aseguradora in 2008, becoming the first female CEO in the auto insurance sector. In October 2010, she was appointed as CEO of Bankinter. At the time she was the only woman leading an IBEX 35 company. During her time in office, Bankinter purchased Barclays’ Portugal-based non-core assets for about 175 million euros in 2015.

Other activities 
 Acciona, Independent Member of the Board of Directors (since 2021)
 Esure, Independent Member of the Board of Directors (2013-2018)

Recognition 
In 2013, Dancausa was chosen by Forbes as the best CEO in Spain. In 2016, she finished third.

References 

1959 births
Living people
Spanish chief executives
Spanish bankers